Jean-François Ott (born 1965) is a serial entrepreneur and the founder of ORCO, the Luxembourg real estate investment company. Jean-François Ott is the founder and CEO of ORCO which today has 6 billion market cap and MaMaison Hotels chain. He is now  chairman of Ott Properties, and Fonciere Paris Nord.

Education and career 
Jean-François Ott completed his graduation in Finance and Economics at the Grenoble Institute of Political Studies in 1985, he completed his studied at the INSEAD Owners Directors Program.

In 1987, Before starting a career as a derivatives trader in Paris, he worked for the French group Framatome in South Korea, then in 1991, he founded ORCO a real estate development company based in Luxembourg.

References

External links 

 

1965 births
Living people